The Net Group is specialized in express courier deliveries, first to last mile domestic and international e-commerce solutions, freight-forwarding, warehousing and other logistics services, covering the entire supply chain across various industries in the MENA region.

Company profile
The Net Group is a regional group specialized in express courier deliveries; first to last mile domestic and international eCommerce; air, sea & ground freight-forwarding services; warehousing; reverse logistics services; critical & temperature-controlled packaging and transportation; heavy-lift & out-of-gauge cargo; and other logistics services covering various industries in the MENA region, with offices in Lebanon, Dubai, Jordan, and Iraq.

History
Mourad Aoun, a Lebanese entrepreneur started The Net Holding in 1994 as a representation of Skynet Worldwide Express. Since then, the holding company consolidated all its express, logistics and freight divisions, namely SkyNet, Net Logistics, Net Critical, Net Express, and Net Projects, under one commercial brand: The Net Group.

References

1994 establishments in Lebanon
Logistics companies of Lebanon
Supply chain management
Companies established in 1994